The Setúbal Football Association (Associação de Futebol de Setúbal, abrv. AF Setúbal) is the district governing body for all football competitions in the Portuguese district of Setúbal. It is also the regulator of the clubs registered in the district.

Notable clubs in the Setúbal FA
 Vitória de Setúbal
 Barreirense
 Fabril (formerly CUF Barreiro)
 Amora
 Seixal
 Montijo
 Cova da Piedade

Current Divisions - 2021–22 season
The AF Setúbal runs the following division covering the fifth and sixth tiers of the Portuguese football league system.

First division
Alcochetense
CD Cova Piedade B
CDR Águas de Moura
Charneca Caparica
Comércio e Indústria
Fabril Barreiro
FC Setúbal
GD Alfarim
Moitense
Monte Caparica AC
O Grandolense
Olímpico Montijo
Palmelense
Pescadores
Seixal Clube 1925
Sesimbra
Trafaria
União Santiago
Vitória Setúbal B
Vasco da Gama Sines

Second division
ACRUT Zambujalense
AD Quinta do Conde
Alcochetense B
Almada AC
Amora FC B
Arrentela
Barreirense B
Botafogo Cabanas
Brejos de Azeitão
Estrela St. André
GC Corroios
GD Lagameças
Juventude Sarilhense
Os Pelezinhos
Paio Pires FC
Samouquense
Santoantoniense
União Banheirense

All-time Primeira Liga table
These are the most successful Setúbal FA clubs in the history of Primeira Liga (as of 02/2021):

See also
 Portuguese District Football Associations
 Portuguese football competitions
 List of football clubs in Portugal

References 

Portuguese District Football Associations
Sport in Setúbal District